Moonbase is a 1990 city-building game set on the Moon. Developed by Wesson International, it was published for Amiga and MS-DOS. An updated version, called Lunar Command, was published in 1993 by Mallard Software.

Gameplay
Players assume the role of manager and must build then expand their moonbase, balancing the production of essentials such as air and power in order to keep the base running within a budget.

Reception

Computer Gaming World in 1991 stated that Moonbase was "a realistic simulation that offers a challenge", with "visual spice and a pinch of whimsy". In a 1992 survey of science fiction games the magazine gave the title four out of five stars, describing it as "Probably the most detailed realistic space 'construction' set ever produced. Not for the 'joystick' crowd, but recommended for the user willing to engage his brain". In 1993 the magazine recommended the game as educational and "worthwhile" for children in middle school and older. A 1994 survey of strategic space games set in the year 2000 and later gave Lunar Command three stars out of five, stating that "its economic modeling is excellent. Overall excitement is on a somewhat lower plane".

References

External links 
 
 

1990 video games
Amiga games
City-building games
DOS games
Wesson International games
Video games developed in the United States
Video games set on the Moon
Mindscape games